Atlantic Geology is a peer-reviewed scientific journal covering the geology of Atlantic Canada and related areas. It is the only regional geology journal in Canada and publishes papers, notes and discussions on original research, and review papers. It was established in 1965 and since 1986 has been published by the Atlantic Geoscience Society with digital publishing assistance from the University of New Brunswick. The journal was one of the first all-digital publications in Canada.

History
The journal was established in 1965 as Maritime Sediments and later renamed Maritime Sediments and Atlantic Geology before obtaining its current name. The founding editor-in-chief was Daniel Stanley (Dalhousie University).

Subsequent editors have included Deryck Laming, Bernard Pelletier, George Pajari, Ron Pickerill, G Williams, and the current editors, Sandra Barr (Acadia University), Rob Fensome (Geological Survey of Canada), Simon Haslett (Cardiff University), and David West (Middlebury College).

Abstracting and indexing 
The journal is abstracted and indexed by GeoRef, Scopus, Science Citation Index Expanded, Current Contents/Physical, Chemical & Earth Sciences, and The Zoological Record. According to the Journal Citation Reports, the journal has a 2012 impact factor of 0.856.

References

External links
 

English-language journals
Publications established in 1965
Geology journals
Academic journals published by learned and professional societies